Charles Albert III, Prince of Hohenlohe-Waldenburg-Schillingsfürst (28 February 1776 – 15 June 1843) was the 4th Prince of Hohenlohe-Waldenburg-Schillingsfürst from 1796 to 1843.

Life 
Charles Albert III was the second child and first son of Charles Albert II, Prince of Hohenlohe-Waldenburg-Schillingsfürst (1742-1796), by his second wife, the Hungarian Baroness Judith Reviczky de Revisnye (1751-1836). His brother Franz Joseph (1787-1841) was the founder of the branch of the Dukes of Ratibor and Princes of Corvey.

On 11 July 1797 in Munich, he married his first wife Princess Auguste of Isenburg and Büdingen in Birstein a granddaughter of Wolfgang Ernst I of Isenburg-Birstein from his third marriage, they had three children prior Augusta's death in 1803, only one of which became adult.

 Prince(ss) born and died on 2 December 1798
 Princess Karoline of Hohenlohe-Waldenburg-Schillingsfürst (1800-1857)
 Prince(ss) born and died on 26 February 1802

Once widower, he married again on 30 May 1813 in Heiligenberg with Princess Leopodine of Fürstenberg (1791-1844), daughter of Karl Aloys zu Fürstenberg (1760-1799) and Princess Elisabeth of Thurn and Taxis (1767-1822) daughter of Alexander Ferdinand, 3rd Prince of Thurn and Taxis. They had four children:

 Friedrich Karl, 5th Prince of Hohenlohe-Waldenburg-Schillingsfürst (1814-1884) married his uncle Franz Joseph' daughter Princess Theresa of Hohenlohe-Schillingsfürst (1816-1891) and had issue
 Chlodwig Karl Joseph Maria Prince of Hohenlohe-Waldenburg-Schillingsfürst
 Friedrich Franz von Hohenlohe-Waldenburg-Schillingsfürst
 Princess Katharina of Hohenlohe-Waldenburg-Schillingsfürst (1817-1893) married twice, his second marriage was with Karl, Prince of Hohenzollern-Sigmaringen, both marriages were childless
 Prince Karl (1818-1875), married Countess Theresa Meraviglia-Crivelli (1836-1918) and had issue
 Prince Egon (1819-1865), married Countess Therese Thurn-Hofer und Valsassina (1817-1893) and had issue including Marie who was the mother of Alessandro, 1st Duke of Castel Duino.

Prince Charles Albert and Princess Leopoldine separated few years later, with the Prince withdrawing to live in his Hohenlohe estates.

Sources 
Karl Albrecht III, Fürst zu Hohenlohe-Waldenburg in Schillingsfürst

1776 births
1843 deaths
House of Hohenlohe